Temnothorax interruptus is a species of ant belonging to the family Formicidae.

Synonyms:
 Temnothorax interruptus interruptus (Schenck, 1852)
 Leptothorax interruptus (Schenck, 1852)
 Leptothorax interruptus interruptus (Schenck, 1852)
 Leptothorax knipovitschi (misspelling)
 Leptothorax knipovitshi Karavaiev, 1916
 Temnothorax knipovitshi (Karavaiev, 1916)

References

Myrmicinae